Hercules Mine may refer to

Hercules Mine, Idaho, USA
Hercules Mine, Maine,  USA
Hercules Mine, Tasmania.